Nupserha fumata is a species of beetle in the family Cerambycidae. It was described by Heyden in 1897. It is known from Borneo.

References

fumata
Beetles described in 1897